Grand Marais is a city and the county seat of Cook County, Minnesota, United States, of which it is the only municipality. It is on Lake Superior's North Shore. Grand Marais had a population of 1,337 at the 2020 census. Before it was settled by French Canadians and before Minnesota's statehood, it was inhabited by the Ojibwe.

The National Scenic Byway begins in Grand Marais and ends near the border with Ontario.

History
The Ojibwe name for the area is Gichi-biitoobiig, which means "great duplicate water," "parallel body of water" or "double body of water" (like a bayou), a reference to the two bays that form this large harbor of Lake Superior.

The area was a bustling fur trading station in the 1700s, and the French Canadian Voyageurs termed the settled village "Grand Marais" ("Great Marsh"), referring to a marsh that, in early fur-trading times, was 20 acres (8.1 ha) or less in area, nearly at the level of Lake Superior, and at the head of the little bay and harbor that led to the settlement of the village there. Another small bay on the east, less protected from storms, is separated from the harbor by a slight projecting point and a short beach. "Grand Marais" also may mean "sheltered water area", as the harbor has natural breakwall rock outcroppings, providing a natural safe harbor for early Lake Superior explorers.

The area is home to several nonprofit educational institutions, such as the Grand Marais Art Colony and the North House Folk School, and art galleries featuring the work of local and regional artists.

On April 13, 2020, a large fire swept through downtown Grand Marais, destroying three buildings: The Crooked Spoon Cafe, White Pine North, and Picnic and Pine. The fire burned for over three hours in intense winds.

Geography

Grand Marais is on the northwestern shore of Lake Superior. It is an entry point for the Boundary Waters Canoe Area Wilderness, at the beginning of the Gunflint Trail. The Superior Hiking Trail passes near Grand Marais, and Judge C. R. Magney State Park is nearby.

The land surrounding Grand Marais slopes up to form the Sawtooth Bluff, a dramatic rock face visible from nearly any vantage point in the city. Adjacent to the bluff is Pincushion Mountain, a large bald monolith with views of Lake Superior and the inland wilderness.

Grand Marais Harbor is protected by Artist's Point, a barrier island formed by lava that was connected to the mainland by gravel deposited by lake currents, forming a tombolo. An Arctic–alpine disjunct community survives there.

Road access to Grand Marais is by Minnesota Highway 61, which follows the shore of Lake Superior, and is known as the North Shore Scenic Drive. The Gunflint Trail (Cook County Road 12) begins in Grand Marais and heads northwest, away from the lake and into the Boundary Waters region.

Grand Marais is 110 miles northeast of Duluth and 38 miles southwest of the Canada–US border.

Climate
Grand Marais has a warm-summer humid continental climate (Köppen Dfb), like the rest of northern Minnesota. Because of the moderating influence of Lake Superior, summer temperatures are cooler, winter temperatures warmer, and the seasonal temperature difference is smaller than locations farther inland. With average highs of just below  in July and August, Grand Marais has the coolest summer temperatures of any weather station in Minnesota.

When winds come from the south, hot temperatures can sometimes hit Grand Marais in spite of the mild summer averages. Cold daytime maximums are less frequent than in Minnesota's interior, but can still be very cold on occasion. The warmest overnight lows in Grand Marais were two  readings during the summer of 1937.

Demographics

2010 census
As of the census of 2010, there were 1,351 people, 673 households, and 331 families in the city. The racial makeup of the city was 93.4% white, 0.4% African American, 2.4% Native American, 0.5% Asian, 0.1% Pacific Islander, 0.6% from other races, and 2.5% from two or more races. Hispanic and Latino residents of any race were 1.6% of the population.

There were 673 households, of which 21.5% had children under the age of 18 living with them, 37.1% were married couples living together, 9.4% had a female householder with no husband present, 2.7% had a male householder with no wife present, and 50.8% were non-families; 43.7% of all households were made up of individuals, and 18.6% had someone living alone who was 65 years of age or older. The average household size was 1.94 persons, and the average family size was 2.67.

The median age in the city was 48.4 years; 18.1% of residents were under the age of 18; 5.1% were between the ages of 18 and 24; 23.2% were from 25 to 44; 30.8% were from 45 to 64; and 23% were 65 years of age or older. The gender makeup of the city was 45.9% male and 54.1% female.

2000 census
As of the census of 2000, there were 1,353 people, 645 households, and 341 families residing in the city. The racial makeup of the city was 94.97% white, 2.81% Native American, 0.15% Asian, 0.15% Pacific Islander, 0.07% from other races, and 1.85% from two or more races. Hispanic and Latino residents of any race were 0.74% of the population. According to the census, 23.3% were of Norwegian, 20.2% German, 11.8% Swedish, 7.0% Irish and 6.1% English ancestry.

There were 645 households, of which 23.3% had children under the age of 18 living with them, 42.9% were married couples living together, 8.1% had a female householder with no husband present, and 47.1% were non-families; 42.0% of all households were made up of individuals, and 21.6% had someone living alone who was 65 years of age or older. The average household size was 2.01 and the average family size was 2.73.

In the city 18.8% of the population were under the age of 18; 6.1% were from 18 to 24; 25.9% were from 25 to 44; 22.8% were from 45 to 64; and 26.3% were 65 years of age or older. The median age was 45. For every 100 females, there were 83.1 males. For every 100 females age 18 and over, there were 80.8 males.

The median income for a household in the city was $33,493, and the median income for a family was $46,563. Males had a median income of $31,500. The median income for females was  $23,393. The per capita income for the city was $21,863. About 7.4% of families and 10.0% of the population were below the poverty line, including 11.9% of those under age 18 and 12.0% of those age 65 or over.

Arts and culture

Due to the pleasant summer climate with Lake Superior's cooling and temperature moderating effect, and due to the lake-effect snow in winter, tourism is a large component of the town's economy. Grand Marais hosts numerous festivals. They celebrate the history and culture of the North Shore and the city itself.
 Fisherman's Picnic is held in Grand Marais during the first weekend in August. It originated in the days when the area's economy was based on logging and commercial fishing, and the community gathered for a shoreline potluck picnic featuring a fish fry of fresh Lake Superior herring. The tradition continues with the Lions Club's Famous Fishburger Stand. Herring, still provided by local commercial fishermen, is dipped in coating, fried golden brown and served piping hot on a hot dog bun. Each year, Fisherman's Picnic features fireworks over the harbor, contests, and a parade.
 Moose Madness is held the third weekend in October. It celebrates the area's moose population, and is a family-themed event with games, prizes, and activities.
 Grand Marais Arts Festival. This longstanding event is held in early July along Lake Superior's North Shore, in town, with over 70 local and regional artists, live music, and art demonstrations. It is hosted by the Grand Marais Art Colony.
 Summer and Winter Solstice Festivals, hosted by the North House Folk School. 
 Le Grand Du Nord. This race takes place on Memorial Day weekend, and is a gravel course that starts in the village's harbor area. The route than climbs to a view of the U.S./Canada border, with almost 6,000 feet of climbing.
 Lake Superior Storm Fest, sponsored by Visit Cook County, celebrated the gales of November and stormy season of Lake Superior.

Parks and recreation
There are numerous hiking trails in and around Grand Marais, including the Grand Marais breakwater trail, which leads to the Grand Marais lighthouse. Area fishing lakes are also said to be some of the best in the state.

Government

Education
All of the county is zoned to Cook County ISD 166.

Media

Newspapers
 Cook County News Herald
 Northern Wilds Media is a monthly magazine that covers the lifestyle of Lake Superior’s North Shore, the BWCAW and northwestern Ontario with news, events, features, and columns.

Radio
 WMLS FM 88.7, Minnesota Public Radio classical
 WLSN FM 89.7, Minnesota Public Radio news and talk
 WTIP FM 90.7, North Shore Community Radio
 K220BI FM 91.9, simulcasting Duluth's Christian talk and teaching KDNI owned by the University of Northwestern – St Paul
  WFNX FM 95.3, local independent broadcaster. Broadcasting a AAA format.
 K288BF FM 105.5, simulcasting Duluth's Contemporary Christian KDNW owned by the University of Northwestern – St Paul

See also
 Grand Marais Light
 Grand Marais/Cook County Airport
 Grand Marais/Cook County Seaplane Base

References

External links

 
 City of Grand Marais
 Grand Marais Chamber of Commerce
 Grand Marais Area Tourism Association

Cities in Minnesota
Cities in Cook County, Minnesota
Minnesota populated places on Lake Superior
County seats in Minnesota